The discography of the American Chicago hip hop group Crucial Conflict consists of three studio albums, one extended play, one compilation album, one mixtape and ten singles.

Albums

Studio albums

Extended plays

Compilation albums

Mixtapes
Ill-Legal: The Street Mix Tape

Singles

Promotional singles

Guest appearances

References

External links
Crucial Conflict discography at AllMusic
Crucial Conflict on Apple Music
Crucial Conflict discography at Discogs
Crucial Conflict recordings at MusicBrainz

Hip hop discographies
Discographies of American artists